Gary Arthur Bricknell (13 August 1954 – 25 March 1977) was a South African first-class cricketer who played for Western Province in Section B and Section A of the Currie Cup.

A left-arm orthodox spin bowler, he spent most of his time in Section B. Twice however, in 1976/77, he was promoted to Western Province's Section A side, but struggled in the stronger competition, taking just four wickets at 52.25. He still finished the season as the equal fifth most prolific first-class wicket taker in the country, with 35 victims. In a match at the De Beers Diamond Oval against Griqualand West that season, he had statistically the best performance of his career, with innings figures of 6–55 and 2–14.

On 25 March 1977, at Keetmanshoop in South West Africa, just two weeks after his last first-class appearance, Bricknell was killed in a train crash. He had been on the train with his South African Army regiment, on his way to serve in the Border War.

References

External links 
 

1954 births
1977 deaths
Cricketers from Cape Town
South African cricketers
Western Province cricketers
Railway accident deaths in Namibia
South African military personnel of the Border War
South African military personnel killed in action